is a type of Japanese pottery traditionally from Izushi, Hyōgo prefecture in western Japan.

References

External links 

 
 http://www.izushi.co.jp/experiences02/

Culture in Hyōgo Prefecture
Japanese pottery